Pseudodiploria is a genus of stony corals in the subfamily Faviinae of the family Mussidae. This genus was erected in 2012, having been split off from the genus Diploria. This genus is found in the tropical and subtropical West Atlantic Ocean and the Caribbean Sea.

Characteristics
Pseudodiploria is a colonial coral. Budding is always intracalicular, occurring inside the oral disc of the polyp, within the whorl of tentacles. There is a continuous, trabecular columella but hardly any coenosteum. The septal teeth are three-pointed and are orientated transversely to the septal plane.

Species
The World Register of Marine Species lists the following two species :

Pseudodiploria clivosa (Ellis & Solander, 1786)
Pseudodiploria strigosa (Dana, 1846)

References

Faviinae
Scleractinia genera